Leandro Marques Guilheiro (born August 7, 1983) is a Brazilian male judoka. He won the bronze medal in the lightweight (<73 kg) division at the 2004 Summer Olympics in Athens, Greece and at the 2008 Summer Olympics in Beijing. He became the first Brazilian judoka to win medals at two consecutive Olympic Games.  Guilheiro plays a classical style of judo fighting in an upright stance and using techniques such as uchi mata, ippon seoi nage, morate seoi nage and o soto gari.  He has done modeling work in Brazil.

References

External links
 

1983 births
Living people
People from Suzano
Judoka at the 2004 Summer Olympics
Judoka at the 2008 Summer Olympics
Judoka at the 2012 Summer Olympics
Judoka at the 2007 Pan American Games
Judoka at the 2011 Pan American Games
Olympic judoka of Brazil
Olympic bronze medalists for Brazil
Olympic medalists in judo
Medalists at the 2008 Summer Olympics
Brazilian male judoka
Medalists at the 2004 Summer Olympics
Pan American Games gold medalists for Brazil
Pan American Games silver medalists for Brazil
Pan American Games medalists in judo
Medalists at the 2007 Pan American Games
Medalists at the 2011 Pan American Games
Sportspeople from São Paulo (state)
20th-century Brazilian people
21st-century Brazilian people